"Everybody Has" is a song recorded by South Korean singer Chungha released on February 29, 2020, by MNH Entertainment and distributed by Stone Music Entertainment. The song is part of MNH Entertainment's project album New.wav and of Chungha's first full-length studio album Querencia.

Background
On January 28, 2020, MNH revealed their plans for a new music project New.wav, which aims for the agency artists to more frequently interact with the public through diverse music, apart from their regular album releases. Chungha was the second artist to take part, with teasers dropping weeks before the released of the track.

Release
The song was released through various music portals, including iTunes. A sero live version was released on February 29, 2020, on Dingo Music.

Composition
"Everybody Has" is a sentimental ballad written by Armadillo. The lyrics and the track itself aims to comfort those feeling worn out and exhausted.

Commercial performance
"Everybody Has" was ranked first on major streaming sites, such as Soribada, Genie Music and Bugs. It charted at No. 31 on the Gaon Digital Chart.

Music video
The music video was released on February 29, 2020, which features actress Jo Bo-ah and directed by 비숍 of Vikings League. Jo was seen leaving the city at night for a peaceful countryside.

Charts

Release history

References

2020 singles
2020 songs
Chungha songs
MNH Entertainment singles
Korean-language songs